Carole Sabiston (born 1939) is a Canadian textile artist who lives in Victoria, British Columbia.

Born in London, England to George and Doris Slater, Carole, at the age of 8, moved to Canada with her parents in 1948. First married to Brian Sabiston in 1961, Carole studied art education at UBC and U-Vic. In 1976 she married Jim Munro, owner of Munro's Books, a bookstore in Victoria, B.C. Her tapestries representing the four seasons decorate architecture niches and contribute to the decor that made Munro's make a list of 'Sixteen Bookstores to See Before You Die'.

She has created large-scale installations for public institutions, theatre design, public ceremonies and exhibitions and has received commissions from the Lieutenant Governor of British Columbia, the University of Victoria, the Pacific Forestry Centre, the McPherson Theatre, and mystery writer P.D. James.

Sabiston won the Saidye Bronfman Award for Excellence in 1987 (one of the largest individual visual-arts prizes in Canada, it is administered by the Canada Council for the Arts as one of the Governor General’s Awards in Visual and Media Arts), the Order of British Columbia, is a member of the Royal Canadian Academy (RCA), and was awarded the Queen's Diamond Jubilee Medal and the 125th Canada Medal. In 1995, she received an Honorary Doctorate of Fine Arts from the University of Victoria.

Sabiston was friends with Pulitzer Prize winning author, Carol Shields, who moved down the street from Sabiston in 2000 until Shields died in 2003. As a tribute to her friend, Sabiston created a work of art that stitched together pieces of Shields' clothing.

Her most recent major show was a lifetime retrospective at the Art Gallery of Greater Victoria.

She is the mother of children's television series producer  Andrew Sabiston.

References

1948 births
Living people
English emigrants to Canada
Canadian textile artists
Artists from London
Artists from Victoria, British Columbia
Women textile artists